Marens lille ugle is a Norwegian children's book from 1957, written by Finn Havrevold. The story is about the young girl Maren and her rag owl, which needs comfort when Maren is anxious. The book was adapted for radio, and it was basis for the film Ugler i mosen from 1959, directed by Ivo Caprino.

References

Norwegian books
Children's fiction books
1957 children's books
Norwegian children's literature